The 2014 FIVB Women's Club World Championship was the 8th edition of the event. It was held in Zurich, Switzerland, from 7 to 11 May 2014. The Russian club Dinamo Kazan won the championship.

Qualification

Pools composition

Squads

Venue

Pool standing procedure
Match won 3–0 or 3–1: 3 points for the winner, 0 points for the loser
Match won 3–2: 2 points for the winner, 1 point for the loser
In case of tie, the teams will be classified according to the following criteria:
number of matches won, sets ratio and points ratio

Preliminary round
All times are Central European Summer Time (UTC+2).

Pool A

|}

|}

Pool B

|}

|}

Final round
All times are Central European Summer Time (UTC+2).

Semifinals

|}

3rd place match

|}

Final

|}

Final standing

Awards

Most Valuable Player
 Ekaterina Gamova ( Dinamo Kazan)
Best Opposite Spiker
 Ekaterina Gamova ( Dinamo Kazan)
Best Outside Hitters
 Kenia Carcaces ( Voléro Zürich)
 Suelle Oliveira ( SESI-SP) 

Best Middle Blockers
 Thaísa Menezes ( Molico Osasco)
 Regina Moroz ( Dinamo Kazan)
Best Setter
 Fabiola de Souza ( Molico Osasco)
Best Libero
 Ekaterina Ulanova ( Dinamo Kazan)

References

External links
Official Website of the 2014 FIVB Club World Championship

2014 FIVB Women's Club World Championship
FIVB Women's Club World Championship
FIVB Women's Club World Championship
FIVB Volleyball Women's Club World Championship
Sport in Zürich
21st century in Zürich